Donald Duck talk, formally called buccal speech, is an alaryngeal form of vocalization which uses the inner cheek to produce sound rather than the larynx. The speech is most closely associated with the Disney cartoon character, Donald Duck, whose voice was created by Clarence Nash, who performed it from 1934 to 1984.

Nash discovered buccal speech while trying to mimic his pet goat Mary. In his days before Disney, Nash performed in vaudeville shows where he often spoke in his "nervous baby goat" voice. Later when he auditioned at Walt Disney Productions, Walt Disney interpreted Nash's voice as that of a duck, at which point the idea for Donald Duck came about. Buccal speech was also used by voice actor Red Coffey for the character Quacker in MGM cartoons, and by Jimmy Weldon for the character Yakky Doodle in Hanna-Barbera cartoons.

Production
Buccal speech is created with one of the buccal or cheek sides of the vocal tract. Both the air chamber and the replacement glottis are formed between the cheek and upper jaw. Buccal speech is produced when a person creates an airbubble between the cheek and the jaw on one side and then uses muscular action to drive the air  through a small gap between or behind the teeth into the mouth. The sound so produced  makes a high rough sound. This then is articulated to make speech. The speech sounds made in this way are difficult to hear and have a raised pitch. The technique can also be used to sing, and is usually acquired as a taught or self-learned skill and used for entertainment.

Other cases
 Donald Duck–like speech is described to occur after pseudobulbar dysarthria in which speech gains a high-pitched "strangulated" quality.
 Donald Duck speech effect is described (usually as an undesired phenomenon) in audio engineering when speech is  time compressed, rate controlled, or accelerated.
 The term is sometimes also used to refer to the frequency-shifted speech from an improperly tuned single-sideband modulation (SSB) radiotelephone receiver, or the (nearly unintelligible) sound of a SSB signal on a conventional amplitude modulation (AM) receiver.
 A high pitched nasal voice resembling Donald Duck is sometimes noted in individuals with Prader-Willi syndrome.

See also
 Disco Duck
 Esophageal speech
 Phonation
 Vocal extended technique
 Overtone singing
 Ventriloquism
 Beatboxing
 Circular breathing
 Whistling

Notes

External links
 Donald Duck--What's My Line Clarence C. Nash can be seen in this 12 December 1954 episode making his Donald Duck talk briefly at 7.01-03, 7.18, and 7.20
 (Part 1/2), (Part 2/2) Interview with Tony Anselmo

Human voice
Phonation
Vocal skills
Donald Duck